Štefan Ružička (born February 17, 1985) is a Slovak former professional ice hockey forward who last played under contract with HC Sparta Praha of the Czech Extraliga (ELH). He formerly played in the National Hockey League (NHL) with the Philadelphia Flyers and in the Kontinental Hockey League (KHL) where he is the All-time leading scorer for HC Spartak Moscow.

Playing career
Ružička was drafted in the third round of the 2003 NHL Entry Draft by the Philadelphia Flyers and proceeded to the Canadian Hockey League to play for the Owen Sound Attack, of the Ontario Hockey League, under the direction of head coach Mike Stothers.

On September 14, 2015, Ružička opted to take a hiatus from professional hockey in spite of being only 30 years old. Over a calendar year later, he returned to the professional ranks in securing a contract with HC Sparta Praha of the Czech Extraliga on September 4, 2016.

Career statistics

Regular season and playoffs

International

Awards and honours

References

External links
 

1985 births
Living people
Avangard Omsk players
Lausanne HC players
HC Oceláři Třinec players
Sportspeople from Nitra
Owen Sound Attack players
Philadelphia Flyers draft picks
Philadelphia Flyers players
Philadelphia Phantoms players
Salavat Yulaev Ufa players
Slovak ice hockey right wingers
HC Slovan Bratislava players
HC Sparta Praha players
HC Spartak Moscow players
Slovak expatriate ice hockey players in the Czech Republic
Slovak expatriate ice hockey players in the United States
Slovak expatriate ice hockey players in Russia
Slovak expatriate ice hockey players in Canada
Slovak expatriate ice hockey players in Switzerland